Antiblemma filaria is a species of moth in the family Erebidae. It was described by Smith in 1900 and is found in North America.

The MONA or Hodges number for Antiblemma filaria is 8578.

References

 Lafontaine, J. Donald & Schmidt, B. Christian (2010). "Annotated check list of the Noctuoidea (Insecta, Lepidoptera) of North America north of Mexico". ZooKeys, vol. 40, 1-239.

Further reading

External links

 Butterflies and Moths of North America
 NCBI Taxonomy Browser, Antiblemma filaria

Eulepidotinae
Moths described in 1900